Pachydactylus fasciatus, also known as the striped thick-toed gecko, banded thick-toed gecko, thick-toed banded gecko, or Damaraland banded gecko, is a species of lizard in the family Gekkonidae. It is endemic to northwestern Namibia.

References

Endemic fauna of Namibia
Pachydactylus
Reptiles of Namibia
Reptiles described in 1888